Galeazzo I Visconti (21 January 1277 – 6 August 1328) was lord of Milan from 1322 to 1327. After being chosen Captain of Milan, he defeated two papal armies and was excommunicated by Pope John XXII. Temporarily imprisoned for murder, Galeazzo retired to Pescia and died in August 1328.

Biography
Galeazzo was the son of Matteo I Visconti and Bonacosa Borri. On 24 June 1300 he married Beatrice d'Este, daughter of Obizzo II d'Este. The following year the Visconti were however forced to leave Milan and he lived at the Este and Bonacolsi courts for several years.

In 1322 Galeazzo was named capitano del popolo in Milan, and defeated a Papal-Angevin army at Bassignana. He was excommunicated by Pope John XXII in March 1323 and unrest in Milan impaired his authority. With the support of Emperor Louis IV, at Monza Galeazzo defeated an army sent against him by John XXII. In 1328, after accusations of betrayal from his brother Marco, as well as that of the assassination of his brother Stefano Visconti, the emperor had him imprisoned in Monza. Galeazzo was freed in March 1328 and took shelter under the other Ghibelline leader of Italy at the time, Castruccio Castracani. However, he died at Pescia in August 1328.

His son Azzone succeeded him in Milan. His daughter Ricciarda was married to Tommaso II di Saluzzo.

Ancestry

References

Sources

1277 births
1328 deaths
Galeazzo 1
Rulers of Milan
14th-century Italian nobility